was a Japanese politician of the Democratic Party of Japan (DPJ) who served as a member of the House of Councillors in the Diet. 

A native of Nagasaki and a graduate of Waseda University, he was elected to the House of Representatives for the first time in 1963. He lost his seat in 1983 but was re-elected in 1986. He lost the seat again in 2000 and was elected to the House of Councillors for the first time in 2001. In 2010, he was elected as the President of the House of Councillors, as a member of the DPJ.

References

Sources

External links
 Official website in Japanese.

1936 births
2011 deaths
People from Nagasaki
Members of the House of Representatives (Japan)
Members of the House of Councillors (Japan)
Government ministers of Japan
Waseda University alumni
Democratic Party of Japan politicians
Presidents of the House of Councillors (Japan)